"Vilaiyaadu Mankatha" is a song by Indian artist and film composer Yuvan Shankar Raja. A part of the soundtrack album to the Tamil film Mankatha, it was released as a single track on 20 May 2011. The song was performed by Ranjith, Premgi Amaren, Sucharita and Anitha along with Yuvan Shankar Raja, while Gangai Amaren, Sucharita and Yuvan Shankar Raja penned the lyrics in Tamil, Hindi and English, respectively.

Background 
A teaser the song was released on Ajith Kumar's birthday, on 1 May 2011 on YouTube, after plans of releasing the film or the soundtrack on that day had failed. As the teaser garnered high response and became a success within few days, Venkat Prabhu and Dayanidhi Azhagiri decided to launch the complete version of the song as a single separately ahead of the complete soundtrack album.

Music video 
The video was shot in Bangkok in a club called ‘Club Hollywood’ for four consecutive days, featuring Ajith Kumar, along with dancers from Mumbai and Bangkok, while it was choreographed by Kalyan Kumar. A lot of the crowd, featuring in the music video are the people who actually visited the club during the shoot, giving it a more ‘reality’ feel.

This hip-hop song is Ajith's introduction track in the film. The song already released a couple of months before the album release and has become a hot favourite for many. It is based in a club and gives a nightlife feel. Yuvan has lent the base voice for this song, and the other singers for this track include Anitha, Premgi Amaren, Ranjith and Sucharitha. A trumpet sound is what that indicates the arrival or a celeb or a king and this song has utilized that catchy tune to introduce Ajith.

Release 
Director Venkat Prabhu was determined to launch the soundtrack in an innovative way. He revealed that he would just release one song in the digital medium, so that it can be used for ring tones and caller tunes. The single release would cost  and will come with a poster signed by Ajith Kumar himself. Unlike a usual signature where a lead actor signs one poster and the rest are digitalized, Ajith Kumar reportedly signed all the 5000 posters by himself in three days. Yuvan Shankar Raja had handed over the Master recording on 11 May 2011, while the single track released on 20 May 2011.

References

2011 singles
Indian songs
Songs written for films
Songs with music by Yuvan Shankar Raja
Tamil-language songs
Tamil film songs